Penny Spot Beck is a minor watercourse that is entirely in the  county of Norfolk. The beck rises within the parish of Dereham ½ mile south  of the village of Swanton Morley. The beck is a tributary of the River Wensum. After a distance of  it joins the River Wensum.

References

Rivers of Norfolk